The following is an alphabetical list of members of the United States House of Representatives from the state of South Carolina.  For chronological tables of members of both houses of the United States Congress from the state (through the present day), see United States congressional delegations from South Carolina.

Current representatives 
As of January 2023
 : Nancy Mace (R) (since 2021)
 : Joe Wilson (R) (since 2001)
 : Jeff Duncan (R) (since 2011)
 : William Timmons (R) (since 2019)
 : Ralph Norman (R) (since 2017)
 : Jim Clyburn (D) (since 1993)
 : Russell Fry (R) (since 2023)

List of members

See also

List of United States senators from South Carolina
United States congressional delegations from South Carolina
South Carolina's congressional districts

References

 Congressional Biographical Directory of the United States 1774–present

 
South Carolina
United States rep